Yuntai Town is an urban town in Changshou District, Chongqing, People's Republic of China.

Administrative division
The town is divided into 13 villages and 1 community, the following areas: Yuntai Community, Bazi Village, Zhaikou Village, Xiaoyan Village, Anping Village, Bajiao Village, Limin Village, Qiaoba Village, Gongqiao Village, Huangge Village, Yingzhu Village, Qingyun Village, Meituo Village, and Liyu Village (云台社区、八字村、寨口村、小岩村、安坪村、八角村、利民村、桥坝村、拱桥村、黄葛村、应祝村、青云村、梅沱村、鲤鱼村).

External links

Divisions of Changshou District
Towns in Chongqing